A Place in Time is an album by trumpeter/composer Wallace Roney which was recorded in 2016 and released on the HighNote label.

Reception

Financial Times reviewer, Mike Hobart, stated "Roney's beautifully rounded tone and clear sense of purpose is matched by the impressively muscular playing of young saxophonist Ben Solomon; veteran alto saxophonist Gary Bartz beefs up the brass". In JazzTimes, Philip Booth noted "A Place in Time, suggests that the group's penchant for fruitful compositions, dynamic interplay and bracing solos remains intact. More than half of the set is devoted to originals ... Here's hoping it won't take another 15 years for a sequel".

Track listing 
 "Around and Through" (Patrice Rushen) – 6:43
 "Elegy" (Tony Williams) – 7:44
 "Air Dancing" (Buster Williams) – 6:25
 "Observance" (Wallace Roney, Ben Solomon) – 4:09
 "Ardéche" (Solomon) – 7:26
 "L's Bop" (Lenny White) – 6:28
 "Clair de Lune" (Claude Debussy) – 5:27
 "My Ship" (Kurt Weill, Ira Gershwin) – 5:07

Personnel 
Wallace Roney – trumpet
Gary Bartz – alto saxophone (tracks 3, 4, 5 & 7)
Ben Solomon – tenor saxophone (tracks 1-7) 
Patrice Rushen – piano (tracks 1-7)
Buster Williams – bass
Lenny White – drums

References 

Wallace Roney albums
2016 albums
HighNote Records albums